Carol A. Roessler (born January 16, 1948) is an American politician and public administrator.  She served as a Republican in the Wisconsin State Senate (1987–2008) and State Assembly (1983–1987).  She left the State Senate in 2008 to join the administration of Democratic Governor Jim Doyle as Administrator of State and Local Finance in the Wisconsin Department of Revenue.  Until 1997, she was known as Carol A. Buettner.

Biography
Born in Madison, Wisconsin, she graduated from Madison West High School and went on to earn her bachelor's degree from University of Wisconsin–Oshkosh.

She was elected as a Republican to the Wisconsin State Assembly in 1982, and was subsequently elected to the Wisconsin State Senate in an April 1987 special election.

Roessler later joined the faculty of Fox Valley Technical College.

Personal life and family
Rossler married Douglas W. Buettner, an Oshkosh, Wisconsin rental property owner, and took his last name.  They divorced in 1993 and, in 1997, she married Paul Roessler and took his name.

References

External links
Governor Doyle Announces Appointment of Senator Carol Roessler as Administrator of State, Local Finance, Eye On Oshkosh, June 18, 2008, press release of new job
 

1948 births
Living people
Wisconsin state senators
Members of the Wisconsin State Assembly
Women state legislators in Wisconsin
21st-century American politicians
21st-century American women politicians
Madison West High School alumni
University of Wisconsin–Oshkosh alumni